STIKes Kapuas Raya or STIKes Kapuas Raya is a public university located in the city of Sintang in Kapuas Raya, Indonesia.

History
Name STIKES KAPUAS RAYA SINTANG is related with name province kapuas raya. Which is form piece of north province of kalbar. Plan to be founded the STIKES KAPUAS RAYA SINTANG is to answer the less of midwife ry and health community to effort the quality improvement human resources in north KALBAR. And at 3 August 2009 it legitimate by regent government with two study program that is:  study program health community (s1), and midwife (DIII).

STIKES  which is protection by group sembilan puluh sembilanand registered in nasional education department. And it also has Vision and mission that is to be a successful medical stuff who are excellent, stand alone, and perceptive. And be held medical institution as  effort to unite education program and health.

This school has many facilities and they are, laboratory medical simulation for midwife and health community, laboratory library, cooperation with bank, consultation room for student, lecturer, and student parent, and hotspot area.

Faculties

Midwife
Public health
Medical records

References

Universities in Indonesia
Educational institutions established in 1959
1959 establishments in Indonesia